Jiří Musil is a former ice dancer who competed mainly for Czechoslovakia. With Anna Pisánská, he is the 1979 Prague Skate bronze medalist and a four-time Czechoslovak national silver medalist. They finished in the top ten at 1979 European Championships in Zagreb, Yugoslavia, and 1980 European Championships in Gothenburg, Sweden. They placed 14th at the 1979 World Championships in Vienna, Austria.

Pisanská and Musil were coached by Kotek and Ivan Rezek in Brno. They emigrated to England in 1980. Representing the United Kingdom, they won gold at the 1982 World Professional Championships in Jaca, Spain.

Results

Amateur career with Pisanská

Professional career with Pisanská

References 

Czechoslovak male ice dancers
Living people
Figure skaters from Brno
Year of birth missing (living people)